Ba Vì National Park is a national park located  west of Hanoi, Vietnam. The park has rich and diverse tropical and subtropical species of flora and fauna.

Ba Vì National Park is located in Ba Vì District of Hanoi and two districts of Hòa Bình Province, namely Lương Sơn and Kỳ Sơn. The Park is situated on a mountain range running north-east and south-west with its peak at Vua Peak of 1,296 m and Tan Vien Peak of 1,226 m and Ngoc Hoa Peak of 1,120 m.

Gallery

External links
 Ba Vi National Park, Vietnam
 Vietnam National Parks

National parks of Vietnam
Protected areas established in 1991
Geography of Hòa Bình province
Geography of Hanoi
1991 establishments in Vietnam